This is a List of Richmond Spiders football players in the NFL Draft.

Key

Selections

Notable undrafted players
Note: No drafts held before 1936

References

Richmond

Richmond Spiders NFL Draft